Seven Pistols for a Massacre or Adios, Hombre, is a 1967 Italian Spaghetti Western film directed by Mario Caiano, written by Eduardo Manzanos Brochero and scored by Francesco De Masi. It stars Craig Hill, Giulia Rubini and Eduardo Fajardo. It was shot in Spain.

Cast

References

External links
 

Spaghetti Western films
1967 Western (genre) films
1967 films
Films directed by Mario Caiano
Films scored by Francesco De Masi
United Pictures Corporation
Films shot at Cinecittà Studios
Films shot in Madrid
1960s Italian films